Events from the year 1943 in Argentina.

Incumbents
 President: Ramón Castillo, Arturo Rawson, Pedro Pablo Ramírez
 Vice President: Sabá Sueyro, Edelmiro Julián Farrell

Governors
 Buenos Aires Province: Rodolfo Moreno, Edgardo J. Míguez, Oscar Cazalas (de facto), Armando Verdaguer, Faustino J. Legón
 Cordoba: Santiago del Castillo
 Mendoza Province: Adolfo Vicchi, Humberto Sosa Molina, Luis Elías Villanueva, Aristóbulo Vargas Belmonte

Vice Governors
 Buenos Aires Province: Edgardo J. Míguez (until 12 June); vacant thereafter (starting 12 June)

Events

January

February

March

April

May
 The Radical Civic Union, the Socialist Party and the Democrat Progresist Party join forces to create the Democratic Union
 The CGT gets divided in two factions, led by J. Domenech and F. Pérez Leiroz

June
 Revolution of '43 – President Ramón Castillo is deposed by a military coup. Arturo Rawson takes the presidency, but he is removed immediately and replaced by Pedro Pablo Ramírez
 A laboral strike in Jujuy causes four deaths

July

August
 Laboral strike of Refrigerators Unions

September

October
 Juan Domingo Perón signs the first collective laboral agreement
 Hugo Wast, ministry of education, outlaws lunfardo and forces many tango artists to rewrite the lyrics of their songs.

November
 Juan Domingo Perón is appointed for the Secretary of Labour and Welfare. 
 Many communist leaders, as José Peter, are jailed.

December

Unknown date

Ongoing
 Argentina keeps a neutral stance in World War II, amid foreign pressure to join the war

Births
January 6 – Osvaldo Soriano, journalist and writer (died 1997)
January 16 – Jorge Sobisch, politician
February 9 – Santiago Soldati, entrepreneur
March 4 – Aldo Rico, soldier and politician
April 6 – Omar Vergara, Olympic fencer
April 7 – Ángel Marcos, footballer
April 8 – Víctor Bó, film actor and producer
May 1 – Carlos Trillo, comic book writer (died 2011)
May 24 – Héctor Aguer, Archbishop of La Plata
May 30 – Víctor Laplace, actor
June 5 – Hermes Binner, physician and politician
June 14 – Jeanine Meerapfel, German-Argentine film director and screenwriter
July 13 
Carlos Borcosque Jr., film director and screenwriter
Juan Carlos Sconfianza, footballer
July 23 – Hugo Arana, film, television and theatre actor
August – Norberto Ceresole, sociologist and political scientist (died 2003)
August 1 – Carlos Roffé, film and television actor (died 2005)
August 2 – Emilio Disi, actor
August 3 – Elio Roca, singer
August 4 – Angel Balzarino, writer
August 18 – Norma Pons, actress (died 2014)
September 17 – Carlos Sampayo, writer
October 6 – Luis Alberto, footballer
October 18 – Andrej Bajuk, Slovene politician and economist brought up in Argentina (died 2011)
October 19 – Adolfo Aristarain, film director and screenwriter
November 1 – José Ignacio García Hamilton, writer, historian, lawyer and politician (died 2009)
November 5 – Mariano Etkin, composer
November 6 – Roberto Telch, footballer
November 12 – Claudio Slon, jazz drummer (died 2002)
November 16 
Juan Giménez, comic book artist
Rodolfo Terragno, politician, lawyer and journalist
November 18 – Leonardo Sandri, Roman Catholic cardinal
November 25 – Dante Caputo, academic, diplomat and politician
December 6 – Miguel Lunghi, politician
December 12 – Miguel Ángel Raimondo, footballer
date unknown 
Guillermo Vargas Aignasse, politician (disappeared 1976)
Liliana Heker, writer
Carlos Santiago Nino, philosopher (died 1993)
Miguel Angel Varvello, bandoneon player
Horacio Vaggione, composer
Barylka Yerahmiel, rabbi, educator, journalist and lecturer

Deaths
January 11 – Agustín Pedro Justo, President of Argentina 1932–1938 (born 1876)
January 29 – José A. Ferreyra, film director and screenwriter (born 1889)
August 24 – Antonio Alice, painter (born 1886)
October 15 - Sabá Sueyro, politician (born 1876)
October 25 - Hubert Duggan, Argentine-born British soldier and politician (born 1904; tuberculosis)
December 7 – Collier Twentyman Smithers, Argentine-born British painter (born 1867)

See also
List of Argentine films of 1943

References

Bibliography
 

 
Years of the 20th century in Argentina